The Old Post Office and Court House is a historic former federal government building at 295 Water Street in downtown Augusta, Maine. Built in 1886-1890, it is one of Maine's finest surviving examples of Romanesque Revival architecture.  It was listed on the National Register of Historic Places in 1974.

Design and Construction 
The former Post Office and Court House stands on the east side of Water Street, Augusta's principal commercial downtown thoroughfare, at the southeast corner with Winthrop and Front Streets.  It is a symmetrical 2-1/2 story granite structure with a central tower, flanked on either side by a wall and smaller tower. It was designed by Mifflin E. Bell (1846-1904), the Supervising Architect of the US Treasury Department. Bell's term ended July 1887, and his successor William Alfred Freret finished the job, and the building opened in January 1890. The cost of construction was $178,281.20. It contained 427,600 cubic feet, was heated by steam, and contained a hydraulic freight elevator for post office use.

The building was enlarged sometime during the tenure of treasury architect James Knox Taylor (1897 to mid-1912).

History 
The building was used as a courthouse and post office until the 1960s, when a new, larger federal building was constructed for these uses. The Old Post Office was sold as surplus property to a private owner.  It was adaptively repurposed to house a bank, restaurant, and office, while largely preserving the exterior.

See also 
 National Register of Historic Places listings in Kennebec County, Maine

References

External links 

 

Buildings and structures in Augusta, Maine
Romanesque Revival architecture in Maine
National Register of Historic Places in Augusta, Maine